Metheringham railway station serves the village of Metheringham in Lincolnshire, England. It lies on the Peterborough–Lincoln line. It is owned by Network Rail and managed by East Midlands Railway, which provides all its rail services.

History
The station opened to passengers on 1 July 1882 as Blankney and Metheringham. It closed to them on 11 September 1961 but reopened on 6 October 1975 as Metheringham. It was being refurbished in 2019. The signal box at the south end of the station is labelled "Blankney". It formerly operated the level crossing on the B1189 road, but it closed in 2014, with its functions passing to the Lincoln Signalling Control Centre.].

Names
Blankney & Metheringham
Metheringham (from 6 October 1975)

Facilities
The station is unstaffed, and offers limited facilities. Both platforms have shelters and modern help points. There is a small car park and bicycle storage facility at the station. The full range of tickets for travel can be bought from the guard on the train at no extra cost as there are no retail facilities at the station.

Services
All services at Metheringham are operated by East Midlands Railway.

There is no Sunday service at the station.

References

External links

Railway stations in Lincolnshire
DfT Category F2 stations
Former Great Northern and Great Eastern Joint Railway stations
Railway stations in Great Britain opened in 1882
Railway stations in Great Britain closed in 1961
Railway stations in Great Britain opened in 1975
Reopened railway stations in Great Britain
Railway stations served by East Midlands Railway